Aleksei Alekseyevich Brusilov (– 17 March 1926) was a Russian and later Soviet general most noted for the development of new offensive tactics used in the 1916 Brusilov Offensive, which was his greatest achievement. The innovative and relatively successful tactics used were later copied by the Germans.

Born into the aristocracy to a father who was also a general, Brusilov trained as a cavalry officer, but by 1914 he realized that cavalry was obsolete in the new style of warfare because of its vulnerability to machine gun and artillery. Historians portray him as the only First World War Russian general capable of winning major battles. However, his heavy casualties seriously weakened the Russian army, which was unable to replace its losses.

Despite his prominent role in the Imperial Russian Army, he sided with the Bolsheviks in the Russian Civil War and aided in the early organization of the Red Army.

Early life
Brusilov was born in Tiflis (now Tbilisi, Georgia). His father Aleksi Nikolaevich Brusilov was Russian and his mother, Anna Luiza Niestojemska, was Polish. Three generations of Brusilovs had served as officers in the Imperial Russian Army, his grandfather fighting in the defense against Napoleon's invasion of 1812. His father rose to the rank of Lieutenant General before dying of tuberculosis in 1856. Brusilov's mother died shortly afterwards, and the young orphan was raised by relatives in Kutaisi.

He was educated at home until the age of 14. He joined the Imperial Corps of Pages in Saint Petersburg in 1867. At the end of his first year, a tutor remarked of Brusilov, "his nature is brisk and even playful, but he is good, straight-forward and clean-living. Of high ability, but inclined to be lazy."

In 1872, on completion of the Corps' programme, he sought admission to the advanced class for top ranking students, but was unsuccessful, and instead was posted as an ensign (Praporshchik) to the 15th (Tver) Dragoon Regiment. Usually, graduates from the Corps of Pages sought admission to one of the Guards regiments, but the Tver Dragoons were at that time stationed near Kutaisi, so the posting suited Brusilov on the basis of being near his family and being less financially draining than service in the Guards.

Russo-Turkish War
Brusilov joined the Tver Dragoons in August 1872 and was given command of a troop, but it was not long before his aptitude resulted in the appointment as regimental adjutant. He was promoted to lieutenant in 1874.

He served with distinction in the Russo-Turkish War, 1877–78, being mentioned in despatches on three occasions. His unit operated on the Southern Front in the Caucasus, and took part in the assault of the fortress of Ardagan (now Ardahan, Turkey), for which Brusilov was awarded the Order of Saint Stanislav, 3rd Class. Later in the war, he also received the Order of Saint Anne, 3rd Class, and was promoted to the rank of Stabskapitän. Towards the end of the war, he led successful attacks on Ottoman Army positions around Kars, and his membership of the Order of Saint Stanislav was elevated to 2nd Class.

The Cavalry Officer School
In 1881, Brusilov became a student at the Cavalry Officer School in Saint Petersburg and two years later was appointed as a riding instructor there. He spent the next thirteen years in a succession of posts at the school – Adjutant, Senior Teacher of Riding and Breaking Horses, Section Commander, Troop Commander, Squadron Commander and Assistant Chief of the School. On promotion to Major General in 1900, Brusilov was added to the list of Household Troops (officers who might be retained on official business by the Tsar). During this time, Brusilov married (1884), and the union produced a son in 1887.

In 1902, as a Lieutenant General, he took command of the school, and under his leadership, the "Horse Academy" became an acknowledged centre of excellence in preparing staff officers for the cavalry. Brusilov published papers on the use of cavalry and visited France, Austria-Hungary and Germany to study riding tuition and stud management.

Brusilov was appointed to command the 2nd Guards Cavalry Division in 1906, but this was not a happy posting for him. The 1905 Russian Revolution had left St Petersburg in turmoil, and after his wife's death, he sought a posting away from the Guards and the capital.

In 1908, he was appointed to command the 14th Army Corps in the Warsaw Military District, where his tenure was notable for the improvements in combat training he implemented. He also remarried at this time, to Nadejda ("Hope") Jelihovski. Promoted to General of Cavalry in 1912, he became Deputy Commander-in-Chief of forces in the Warsaw Military District. The failures of the Russo-Japanese War had led to allegations that generals from immigrant families, who made a significant fraction of the Russian Army's senior ranks, were less patriotic than those who traced their origins to within Russia's borders, and Brusilov would come into conflict with the Governor-General in Warsaw, Georgi Skalon, and other "Russian-German" generals in that District. Brusilov was soon seeking another post.

In 1913, Brusilov was posted to command the 12th Army Corps in the Kiev Military District, remarking on his departure, "I do not doubt, that my departure will produce a sensation in the troops of Warsaw region... Well! What's done is done, and I am glad, that I have escaped cesspool of Skalon's court atmosphere."

First World War

1914–1915

In July 1914, with the Russian army expanding during mobilisation, Brusilov was promoted to command the 8th Army, part of the Southwest Front operating in Galicia. Reverses elsewhere along the Front, including the great defeat at Tannenberg, forced the 8th Army to retreat in conformity with the general Russian withdrawal. For his victories, Brusilov was awarded the Order of Saint George 4th, and then 3rd Class. By a quirk of fate, several future White Army commanders held senior posts in 8th Army at this time—Brusilov's Quartermaster general was Anton Denikin, while Alexey Kaledin commanded the 12th Cavalry Division and Lavr Kornilov was in command of 48th Infantry Division.

In the early part of 1915, Brusilov again advanced, penetrating the Carpathian passes and entering the Great Hungarian Plain. At this time, Nikolai II visited the 8th Army and Brusilov was promoted to the rank of General-Adjutant (in the Imperial Russian Army this was a "four-star" General rank).

Once again, fortunes on other fronts would determine his actions, and the Central Powers breakthrough at Gorlice-Tarnów forced Brusilov to withdraw as part of the general retreat. By September, the 8th Army had withdrawn  to the Tarnopol region. However, Brusilov's victories cast doubt on Austria-Hungary's ability to defend itself against Russian offensives and forced its senior military ally the German Empire to divert forces from the Western Front to assist it.

In October 1915, Brusilov wanted to deport 20,000 German civilians from Volhynia. With Stavka Chief of Staff General Mikhail Alekseyev's permission, Brusilov carried out the operation.

The Brusilov Offensive

On 29 March 1916, Brusilov was given command of the Southwest Front and managed to secure a certain degree of freedom of action. Previous Russian offensives demonstrated a tendency to assault smaller and smaller sections of the front with increasing density of artillery and manpower to achieve a breakthrough. The narrow frontage of these attacks made counterattacks straightforward for German forces, and this approach met with repeated failure for the Russians.

Brusilov decided to distribute his attack over the entirety of Southwest Front. He hoped to disorganise the enemy over such a large area that some point would fatally give way. He decided not to waste resources by saturation bombardment of worthless areas, but to use interdiction fire against command posts, road networks, and other critically important targets to degrade German command and control over the whole front. The noted German artillery commander, Georg Bruchmüller, having served opposite Brusilov's Front at this time, would learn from and adapt these tactics when planning the preparatory bombardment for Operation Michael on the Western Front in 1918. Brusilov was not even concerned with securing a tremendous local advantage in manpower, permitting Divisions under his command to be transferred to other Fronts (so long as they attacked in support of his offensive).

However, the planned supporting attack from West Front (the Army group to Brusilov's north) was not delivered, and Germany was able to transfer 17 divisions from France and Belgium to halt the Russian advance.

Brusilov was awarded the Sword of Saint George with Diamonds for his greatest victory, one of only 8 Russian commanders to receive this award during the First World War.

From 27 June to 3 July 1916, Brusilov carried out, on his own initiative, the deportation of 13,000 German civilians from the Volhynian areas that had been conquered during the offensive.

1917 and Revolution

With the onset of the February Revolution in Russia, Brusilov argued for the Tsar's abdication. When approached by Stavka for his opinion on the need for the abdication he replied, "... For the moment the only thing that matters is to stabilise our position to allow the continuation of the war with the external enemy... to abdicate in favour of Grand Duke Mikhail and a council of regents... It is necessary to hurry, the faster to extinguish the flames [of revolution], otherwise we face innumerable catastrophic consequences."

That same year in May, Brusilov was appointed Commander in Chief of the Russian Army.

Throughout this period, Brusilov proved sympathetic to revolutionary aspirations, though his primary concern was that the war needed to be won first. In particular, he asserted that until peace was achieved, the full authority of the central government must be respected and that the army should maintain the full rigour of its disciplinary code. In a telegram to the Minister of War, Alexander Kerensky, he wrote, "... only the application of capital punishment will stop the decomposition of army and will save freedom and our homeland".

This unpopular stand, together with the failure of the Kerensky Offensive in July 1917, led to Brusilov's replacement as Commander in Chief by his former deputy, Lavr Kornilov. Brusilov moved to Moscow and remained there at the disposal of the Russian Provisional Government. He gave an excellent praising to Tomáš Masaryk for Czechoslovak Legion soldiers after Battle of Zborov in July 1917. When fighting broke out in Moscow following the October Revolution, he was severely wounded in the foot by a fragment of a shell that hit his bathroom.

Soviet Russia 

Some former soldiers were serving in the newly formed Red Army, and he concurred with the need for radical change. On 30 May 1920, during the Polish Eastern offensive of the Polish-Soviet War Brusilov published in Pravda an appeal entitled "To All Former Officers, Wherever They Might Be", encouraging them to forgive past grievances and to join the Red Army. Brusilov considered it as a patriotic duty of all Russian officers to join hands with the Bolshevik government, which in his opinion was defending Russia against foreign invaders. On 12 September 1920 Mikhail Kalinin, Vladimir Lenin, Leon Trotsky, Sergey Kamenev and Brusilov signed an appeal "To all officers of the army of Baron Wrangel", in which they called on White Army officers to go over to the side of the Russian Soviet Federative Socialist Republic, accusing Wrangel of acting in the interests of the Polish nobility and the Anglo-French capitalists, who also use the Wrangel army to enslave the Russian people, as like as Czechoslovak corps and "black-skinned divisions". 

Initially, Brusilov served on a special commission to determine the size and structure of the Red Army. Later, he led cavalry recruit training and became Inspector of Cavalry. He retired in 1924 but continued to carry out commissions for the Revolutionary Military Council.

Aged seventy upon his retirement, he lived in his shared apartment with his sickly wife and another couple. He died in Moscow from congestive heart failure, and was given an honourable state funeral, buried in the Novodevichy Convent, by representatives from the 'new Russia' (the Bolsheviks), and the 'old Russia' (the clergy, the middle and upper class). His second wife Nadezhda Brusilova-Zhelikhova (1864–1938) is buried in the Orthodox section of the Olšany Cemetery in Prague, along with a number of other members of the Russian emigration.

Legacy 
His war memoirs were translated into English and published in 1930 as A Soldier's Notebook, 1914–1918. Following the October Revolution, he served the Bolsheviks and joined the Red Army. Many pro-tsarist historians avoided praising or even mentioning his historical role, because of his role in the Red Army. Denikin, for example, a participant in the 1916 offensive and later a leading White commander, portrayed Brusilov as a ditherer who, at a critical moment in the 1916 offensive, "suffered a curious psychological breakdown" and ordered a needless retreat spurred by "imaginary dangers of the enemy breaking through."

Assessment
According to the assessment of British Field Marshal Bernard Montgomery, Brusilov was one of the seven outstanding fighting commanders of World War I, the others being Erich von Falkenhayn (later replaced by Paul von Hindenburg), Erich Ludendorff, Mustafa Kemal, Herbert Plumer, John Monash and Edmund Allenby.

Honours and awards
Russian
Order of St. Anna, 3rd Class, 1878; 2nd Class, 1883; 1st Class, 1909
Order of Saint Stanislaus, 3rd Class with Swords and Bow, 1878; 2nd Class with Swords, 1878; 1st Class, 1903
Order of St. Vladimir, 4th Class, 6 December 1895; 3rd Class, 1898; 2nd Class, 1913
Order of St. George, 4th Class, 23 August 1914; 3rd Class, 18 September 1914
Golden St. George weapons, 27 October 1915; with Diamonds, 20 July 1916

Foreign
Order of the Lion and the Sun, Knight, 1874 (Persian Empire)
Order of the Golden Star of Bukhara, Knight 2nd Class, 1896 (Emirate of Bukhara)
Legion d'Honneur, Grand Officer, 1897 (French Third Republic)
Order of the Red Eagle, Knight 2nd Class, 1898 (Kingdom of Prussia)
Order of Karađorđe's Star (Kingdom of Yugoslavia)

Citations

Bibliography

Further reading
Bark, Sir Peter. "The Last Days of the Russian Monarchy—Nicholas II at Army Headquarters", Russian Review, Vol. 16, No. 3. (1957), pp. 35–44.
Brown, Stephen. "[Review:] Красная звезда или крест? Жизнь и судьба генерала Брусилова (The Red Star or the Cross? Life and Fate of General Brusilov) by Ю.В. Соколов", Slavic Review, Vol. 54, No. 4. (1995), pp. 1087–1088.
Brusilov, A.A. A Soldier's Note-Book, 1914–1918. Westport, CT: Greenwood Press, 1971 (hardcover).
 Chafetz, Glen, and Matthew Ouimet. "Brusilov, Aleksey Alekseyevich." in Timothy C. Dowling, ed., Russia at War: From the Mongol Conquest to Afghanistan, Chechnya, and Beyond (2014): 1:151+
 Cockfield, Jamie H. "General Aleksey Brusilov and the Great Retreat, May–November 1915." Journal of Slavic Military Studies 26#4 (2013): 653-672.
 Dowling, Timothy C. The Brusilov Offensive (Indiana University Press, 2008), The standard scholarly history;  excerpt
Feldman, Robert S. "The Russian General Staff and the June 1917 Offensive", Soviet Studies, Vol. 19, No. 4. (1968), pp. 526–543.
 Higgins, David R. "Analysis: The Brusilov Offensive, 4 June-20 September 1916-Brusilov's offensive was the Russians' last chance to regain the strategic momentum on World War I's eastern front. Here's our analysis of why their effort failed." Strategy and Tactics 274 (2012): 38.
Jones, David R. "The Officers and the October Revolution", Soviet Studies, Vol. 28, No. 2. (1976), pp. 207–223.
Kersnovskiy, A.A. История русской армии (The History of the Russian Army), Vol. 4. (1994), pp. 32–64.
Myatskogo, V.P. (ed.) Biographies of Russian Military Leaders in the First World War. Elakos. (1994) pp. 113–158.
Nikolaieff, A.M. "The February Revolution and the Russian Army", Russian Review, Vol. 6, No. 1. (1946), pp. 17–25.
Stone, Norman. The Eastern Front 1914–1917. London, Hodder and Stoughton (1975).
Wildman, Allan. "The February Revolution in the Russian Army", Soviet Studies, Vol. 22, No. 1. (1970), pp. 3–23.

External links
 
 
 Evgenii Vladimirovich Volkov: Brusilov, Aleksei Alekseevich, in: 1914-1918-online. International Encyclopedia of the First World War.

1853 births
1926 deaths
Military personnel from Tbilisi
People from Tiflis Governorate
Russian untitled nobility
Commanders-in-chief of the Russian Army
Imperial Russian Army generals
Russian military personnel of World War I
Russian Provisional Government generals
Recipients of the Order of Saint Stanislaus (Russian), 1st class
Recipients of the Order of St. George of the Third Degree
Recipients of the Order of St. Anna, 1st class
Recipients of the Order of St. Vladimir, 1st class
Recipients of the Gold Sword for Bravery
Recipients of the Order of St. Sava
Burials at Novodevichy Cemetery
Soviet generals